Asgarabad (also Romanized as ‘Asgarābād; also known as ‘Askarābād) is a village in Sain Rural District, in the Central District of Sarab County, East Azerbaijan Province, Iran. At the 2006 census, its population was 313, in 65 families.

References 

Populated places in Sarab County